Tennis at the 2013 Bolivarian Games took place from 17 to 24 November 2013.

Medal table
Key:

Medalists

References

Events at the 2013 Bolivarian Games
2013 in tennis
2013 Bolivarian Games